Miriam Romei (born 22 November 1995) is an Italian professional racing cyclist. She rides for the Aromitalia Vaiano team.

See also
 List of 2015 UCI Women's Teams and riders

References

External links
 

1995 births
Living people
Italian female cyclists
Cyclists from Florence